Thomas Estes Noell (April 3, 1839 – October 3, 1867) was a U.S. Representative from Missouri, son of John William Noell.

Born in Perryville, Missouri, Noell attended the public schools. He studied law and was admitted to the bar in 1858 and commenced practice in Perryville, Missouri, the same year.
During the Civil War Noell was appointed a military commissioner in 1861. He served as major in the state militia from July 1861 to April 1862. He was appointed captain unassigned in Company C, Nineteenth Infantry, United States Army, and served from April 1, 1862, until his resignation on February 20, 1865, to take his seat in the House of Representatives.

Noell was elected as a Republican to the Thirty-ninth Congress. He was reelected as a Democrat to the Fortieth Congress and served from March 4, 1865, until his death in St. Louis, Missouri, on October 3, 1867.
He was interred in St. Mary's Cemetery, Perryville, Missouri.

See also
List of United States Congress members who died in office (1790–1899)

References

External links 
 
 

1839 births
1867 deaths
United States Army officers
Democratic Party members of the United States House of Representatives from Missouri
Republican Party members of the United States House of Representatives from Missouri
19th-century American politicians
People from Perryville, Missouri